The Albury line is a regional passenger rail service operated by V/Line in Victoria, Australia. It serves passengers between state capital Melbourne and the regional cities of Benalla, Wangaratta, Wodonga, and the NSW border city of Albury.

History
After February 2008, train services on the line terminated at Wangaratta station, with road coaches operating from Wangaratta to Albury.

On 30 May 2008, the then Premier of Victoria John Brumby announced the broad gauge track between Seymour and Albury would be converted to standard gauge, with the project to be combined with the Wodonga Rail Bypass away from the Wodonga CBD. Three V/Line passenger locomotives and 15 passenger carriages were also to be converted to standard gauge to operate the service. Although the project was planned for completion by 2010, it was not finished until the end of June 2011.

While the gauge conversion program was being carried out between 2008 and 2011, all Albury services operated as road coaches north of Seymour, connecting with trains operating between Seymour and Melbourne. 68 seats on the NSW TrainLink Melbourne-Sydney XPT service were also made available at V/Line ticket prices.

Rail services on standard gauge commenced on 26 June 2011 with one service each way each day between Albury and Melbourne. A second daily train service was added from 31 October, with a third daily service commencing operations 22 April 2012, marking the end of road coach replacements on the line. However, serious problems soon emerged with the condition of the standard gauge track north of Seymour, meaning that the new service became very unreliable due to speed restrictions, and trains were regularly replaced by buses.

VLocity DMUs began running on the line on 30 December 2021. The final scheduled locomotive-hauled service on the Albury line ran on 30 July 2022, and was led by N class locomotive N464.

Services

V/Line operates daily passenger trains on the Albury line from Southern Cross station in Melbourne. Services as far as Seymour station are operated as the Seymour line. Services run by Metro Trains Melbourne also operate as far as Craigieburn station as the Craigieburn line.

Classified by V/Line as a long-distance service, a snack bar is provided on board VLocity sets. VLocity DMU sets are exclusively used on the line, with locomotive hauled N type carriages used on the line until 2022, Services run express between Seymour and Melbourne, stopping only at Broadmeadows.

References

External links
http://www.vline.com.au
Official map
Railpage Australia - Discussion and reporting covering the conversion of the line to Standard Gauge

V/Line rail services
Public transport routes in the City of Melbourne (LGA)
Transport in the City of Hume